Coimbatore East was a legislative assembly constituency in the Indian state of Tamil Nadu. It covers parts of Coimbatore. Coimbatore East assembly constituency is a part of the Coimbatore parliamentary constituency. After 2008 delimitation this constituency became defunct.

Members of Legislative Assembly

Election results

2006

2001

1996

1991

1989

1984

1980

1977

1971

1967

1962

1957

1952

References
 

Former assembly constituencies of Tamil Nadu